Pierre Brasseur (22 December 1905 – 16 August 1972), born Pierre-Albert Espinasse, was a French actor.

Biography
The son of actors Georges Espinasse and Germaine Brasseur, the latter a cousin of Albert Brasseur; his grandfather, Jules Brasseur, was an actor as well. The family tradition of using the name Brasseur was continued by his son Claude and his grandson Alexandre.

Renowned for playing outsized characters, Brasseur is best remembered for his (semi-fictionalised) portrayal of the actor Frédérick Lemaître in Les Enfants du Paradis (Children of Paradise, 1945) and as Docteur Génessier (more subdued) in the horror film Les Yeux sans visage (Eyes Without a Face, 1960) co-starring Alida Valli. On 30 May 1927, he performed the spoken role of the Narrator in the world premiere of Igor Stravinsky's opera-oratorio Oedipus Rex.

Honours
Brasseur was made Chevalier (Knight) of the Légion d'honneur in 1966. The following year, he was made Commandeur (Commander) of the Ordre des Arts et des Lettres in 1967.

Selected filmography

 A Father Without Knowing It (1932)
 Honeymoon Trip (1933)
 The Weaker Sex (1933)
 The Uncle from Peking (1934)
 A Rare Bird (1935)
  The Decoy (1935)
 Claudine at School (1937)
 Giuseppe Verdi (1938)
 Hercule (1938)
 Port of Shadows (Le Quai des brumes, 1938)
 Tobias Is an Angel (1940)
 Summer Light (1943)
 Goodbye Leonard (1943)
 Children of Paradise (1945)
 Gates of the Night (1946)
 Jericho (1946)
 Love Around the House (1947)
 Rocambole (1948)
 Cruise for the Unknown One (1948)
 The Secret of Monte Cristo (1948)
 The White Night (1948)
 Millionaires for One Day (1949)
 The Lovers Of Verona (1949)
 The Man from Jamaica (1950)
 Julie de Carneilhan (1950)
 Maître après Dieu (1951)
 Le Plaisir (1952)
 Crimson Curtain (1952)
 The King and the Mockingbird (1952, voice)
 Rasputin (1954)
 Oasis (1955)
 Tower of Lust (1955)
 Napoléon (1955)
 Gates of Paris (1957)
 Life Together (1958)
 Les Grandes Familles (1958)
 The Law (1959)
 Head Against the Wall (1959)
 Eyes Without a Face (1960)
 Carthage in Flames (1960)
 Il bell'Antonio (1960)
 Candide ou l'optimisme au XXe siècle (1960)
 Spotlight on a Murderer (1961)
 The Nina B. Affair (1961)
 Emile's Boat (1962)
 Girl on the Road (1962)
 Lucky Jo (1964)
  (1964)
 Un monde nouveau (1965)
 A Matter of Resistance (1966)
 King of Hearts (1966)
 Fortuna (1966)
 Birds in Peru (1968)
 Sous le signe de Monte-Cristo (1968)
 A Little Virtuous (1968)
 The Married Couple of the Year Two (1971)

References

 Pierre Brasseur's autobiography: Ma Vie en Vrac, Calmann-Lévy, 1972,

External links
 
 
 Pierre Brasseur's biography; accessed 12 December 2014 (in French).

1905 births
1972 deaths
French male film actors
French male silent film actors
French male stage actors
Male actors from Paris
Chevaliers of the Légion d'honneur
Commandeurs of the Ordre des Arts et des Lettres
20th-century French male actors
Troupe of the Comédie-Française
Burials at Père Lachaise Cemetery